The following is a list of awards and nominations received by Candice Bergen.

Bergen is a five-time Primetime Emmy Award winner for her portrayal as the title character on the long-running comedy series Murphy Brown. She was nominated for seven Primetime Emmys for this role, winning five. She was also the recipient of two Golden Globe Award wins for Best Actress – Television Series Musical or Comedy.

Throughout the 1990s and 2000s, Bergen had guest starred as Murphy Brown on various television programs, though in 2005, she began starring on the spin-off series to The Practice, portraying Shirley Schmidt on Boston Legal from 2005 to 2008. It garnered her critical acclaim, receiving additional Golden Globe and Primetime Emmy Award nominations; as well as five Screen Actors Guild Award nominations for her individual role and for the main cast of Boston Legal.

Bergen is widely known mainly for her television work. Though she has been nominated for one Academy Award, one BAFTA Award, and two additional Golden Globe Award nominations for her work in film.

Major associations

Academy Awards

British Academy Film Awards

Golden Globe Awards

Primetime Emmy Awards

Screen Actors Guild Awards

Miscellaneous awards

Blockbuster Entertainment Awards

Golden Raspberry Awards

Teen Choice Awards

Television awards

American Comedy Awards

People's Choice Awards

Satellite Awards

Viewers for Quality Television Awards

Critic awards

Television Critics Association Awards

Festival awards

Monte-Carlo Television Festival

References

External links
 

Bergen, Candice